The Munster Agricultural Society, also known as the MAS, is a non-profit agricultural organisation headquartered in County Cork, Ireland. Founded in 1805, its stated charitable purpose is “to encourage and promote Agricultural, Industrial, Educational and Scientific Pursuits.” It also oversees the Munster Dairy School and Agricultural Institute.

The MAS is one of nine nominating bodies for the Agricultural Panel at the Seanad elections.

History 
It was originally established as the County of Cork Farming Society, changing to the County of Cork Agricultural Society sometime in the 1830s, before evolving in 1908 to its current name. It has run Cork Summer Show since 1806. In 1880, the society established the Munster Dairy School & Agricultural Institute. Richard Barter was its inaugural secretary. It was based in a large, 9-bay, 2-storey residence with farm buildings behind. Located on the Model Farm, it was a Jacobethan style and constructed between 1856-1859. It was the first dairy institute in Ireland or Britain to teach female students.

In the 19th century, the society ran the Munster Model Farm. In a House of Commons (UK Parliament) Debate of the Potato Crop Committee on 25 April 1882, English industrialist and statesman William Edward Forster pointed out to two experiments run on the Model Farm by the organisation. In a House of Commons debate in 1900, Horace Plunkett, then vice-president of the Department of Agriculture for Ireland, supported the Munster Dairy School & Agricultural Institute, stating, "the Department fully intends that in the development of the Institute every feature of its work which has been found of utility to the farming community, such as itinerant dairy instruction, will be continued". The Institute featured in a report on education by the U.S Department of the Interior in 1907. In 1909, Consul H.S Culver reported to the U.S Department of Commerce and Labor that "the Munster Agricultural Society has recently inaugurated a new movement having for its object the introduction of improved methods in Irish agriculture".

In 1908, Mr. A. McDonald J.P, was president of the organisation. The Spring show that year had made an operating profit of £5 18s 10d. As of 1911, Mr. L.A Beamish J.P, was president and Major O'Connor and Mr. R. Bence-Jones J.P, were serving on the executive. By 1913, Lord Barrymore, Sir Warren Crook-Lawless and Sir George Coldhurst were on the MAS' executive. The president was Mr. A. Morrison. In 1918, the Livestock Journal, based in London, England, described a bull sale at its Spring Show in Cork as a "great success". Major M.W Litton was secretary of the society as of 1919.

The showgrounds were formerly based in Ballintemple, Cork. Cork Corporation provided the land as a permanent home for the showground and the society spent £5,300 laying out the grounds and building the necessary structures. The showgrounds opened in 1892. Part of the grounds became part of the rebuilt Páirc Uí Chaoimh.  Cork City Council used the CPO (Compulsory Purchase Order) process to buy the land from the Munster Agricultural Society for €11.5 million, selling it on to the GAA for €1.5 million. Dan Boyle said that the Council’s sale to the GAA, being a non-public body, for a big loss, should be investigated by An Bord Pleanala. Attempting to buy back the lease from the society, in 2006, barrister for Cork City Council, Pearse Sreenan, said the rental of storage space for cars and tiles at the showgrounds to two commercial companies was not in accordance with the objectives of the Munster Agricultural Society (MAS) and thus in breach of its lease agreement. Cork City Council sought to buy out the lease from the MAS through a CPO in order to develop the site as a park. Having leased the grounds in 1892, by 2009 there were 75 years remaining on the lease at the time of the CPO. It emerged that a substantial amount of non-hazardous waste had been found buried on the showgrounds site. As of 2009, the council's Environment Directorate was investigating the matter.

Members of the organisation's General Council (formerly the General Committee), have represented different parts of Munster. In 1931, Edward MacLysaght represented Clare, Ross McGillicuddy represented Kerry and Major-General Sir George Franks represented Limerick. The Earl of Kenmare was involved in the MAS during this period.

Capt. T.A Clarke was elected president of the society in 1919 and remained so until his death in 1936. He was succeeded by his brother, E.J Clarke.

The work of the society was discussed in a parliamentary debate of the Northern Ireland Senate in 1921. Also that year, Capt. T.A Clarke, with Mr. H.T Ryan, F.R.C.V.S, spoke on behalf of the MAS at a meeting of the U.K Commonwealth Shipping Committee. In 1922, Clarke, in the capacity of president, along with the city solicitor, dealt with Henry Ford to build the Centre Park Road in the Marina, Cork.

In 1935, a group of farmers instigated what the Irish Independent called a "half-hearted boycott" of the MAS annual show in Cork, parading the city bearing banners that stated 'Best Livestock Show in Ireland - Fermoy, Twice Weekly - Admission by Favour Only'. In January 1936, at a meeting of the Cork County Council's Committee of Agriculture, J. Daly stated that the MAS should not receive subsidies, declaring that its General Committee was "composed of shoneens and landlords" and that he was glad to have seen the show in Cork boycotted, noting that support of the event had decreased from previous years.

Major-General William Bertram Bell of Fota House, Cork, was president of the society from the early 1950s until the late 1960s, stepping down at 87 years of age. Mrs. Dorothy E. Bell, daughter of the first Baron of Barrymore and wife of Major Bell, was also involved in the Munster Agricultural Society until her death in 1975. Capt. Denis Gould was secretary of the MAS during this period.

As of 1986, the show was second in size to the Royal Dublin Society's Spring Show. In 1987, The Southern Star characterised the society's annual summer show in Cork as "a genteel affair". In 1988, the society announced that it was building a new indoor stadium in Ballintemple at a cost of IR£1 million, which the Irish Press described as the City's "biggest ever venue for conferences and concerts." As of 1990, the MAS hosted an Autumn show. The MAS has held auctions for livestock and machinery.

In 2015, it collaborated with Down Syndrome Cork to establish the "Field of Dreams" project, which opened in 2017. In 2016, the MAS nominated Tim Lombard and Denis O'Donovan to contest the Seanad election. In 2017, the MAS collaborated with Ford to celebrate 100 years of the opening of the Ford Motor Company plant in Cork.

Cork City Council was criticised for attempting to sell a gate lodge to the former site of the Munster Dairy & Agricultural Institute on Model Farm Road. The Council sought €100,000 for the structure, built in the 1860s. It had been in council ownership since 1984 and was used as a social housing unit up to November 2004. While it is not a protected structure, it is listed in the National Inventory of Architectural Heritage but has been formally declared derelict. In 2019, Cork County Council was the lead sponsor of the show. That year, it was reported that the Munster Dairy School & Agricultural Institute had organised a "generous prize fund of €2,500" for awards relating to innovation.

In January 2020, Cork County Council granted planning permission for the society to build an indoor events centre in Curraheen. In February 2020, an appeal was lodged with An Bord Pleanala on the development. In May 2020, An Bord Pleanala ruled against the grant of planning by Cork County Council for the development. Gerard Murphy, a director, stated that €500,000 had been spent in putting the planning application together.

In June 2020, during the COVID-19 pandemic, the society held its first virtual show.

In the Marina Park in Ballintemple, the first phase of which was opened in 2021, a red steel pavilion stands to mark the location of the society's old showgrounds, on which some of the park is located.

Notable members 
Notable people who have served on the society's general council (formerly the 'general committee') includes:
 Edward MacLysaght
 Arthur Smith-Barry
 Ross McGillycuddy
 William Broderick
 Timothy Quill
 William Desmond
 Dorothy Bell
 North L.A Beamish

References 

Organisations based in Cork (city)
Organizations established in 1805
1805 establishments in Ireland
Agricultural organisations based in Ireland
Seanad nominating bodies